The Frog is a small dinghy with an approximate length of 7'10" and an approximate beam of 4'. Its sprit and foresail rig has  of sail area.

References

External links
 https://web.archive.org/web/20070917000249/http://www.ivers.demon.co.uk/merryman.htm

Dinghies